Farzad "Freddy" Bonyadi (born  1959) is an Iranian professional poker player based in Aliso Viejo, California, who has won 4 World Series of Poker bracelets.

Bonyadi moved from Iran to America in 1983, where he worked as an executive host in the LA Commerce Casino and as a shift manager at Hollywood Park Casino.

Bonyadi first major tournament success came when he won the $2,000 limit hold'em event at the 1998 World Series of Poker (WSOP), defeating a final table that included Mimi Tran and John Cernuto on the way to a $429,940 first prize. In the same WSOP, he also made the final table of the $1,500 seven card stud split event, and placed in the money in the $10,000 no limit hold'em main event.

Bonyadi also made a final table in the Season 2 World Poker Tour (WPT) Legends of Poker event, where he finished 5th at a final table featuring Mel Judah, Paul Phillips, T. J. Cloutier, Chip Jett and Phil Laak. Bonyadi made a second WPT final table when he finished runner-up to Scott Seiver in the Season 9 WPT Championship, netting $1,069,900.

Bonyadi has also won WSOP bracelets in the 2004 $1,000 deuce to seven triple draw and the 2005 no limit hold'em tournaments.

At the 2018 WSOP, Bonyadi's mother, Farhintaj Bonyadi, won the $1,000 Super Seniors No Limit Hold'em event, making them the first mother/son World Series of Poker bracelet winners.

As of 2021, his total live tournament winnings exceed $4,500,000. His 31 cashes at the WSOP account for over $2,200,000 of those winnings.

World Series of Poker Bracelets

References

American poker players
Iranian poker players
World Series of Poker bracelet winners
Living people
1950s births
People from Aliso Viejo, California
American people of Iranian descent